Aleksandr Konstantinovich Travin (23 July 1937 – 15 February 1989) was a Russian basketball player. He was a member of the Soviet team during the 1960s, and won a silver medal at the 1964 Summer Olympics. His teams became European champion in 1963 and 1965 and a world champion in 1967. Nationally, his teams won six USSR Premier Basketball League titles in 1960–1962 and 1964–1966.

He graduated from the Institute of Physical Education in Smolensk and after retirement worked as a coach and lecturer in physical education. After 1979 he coached in East Germany.

His father, Konstantin Travin, was also an international basketball player and coach.

References

1937 births
1989 deaths
Soviet men's basketball players
1963 FIBA World Championship players
1967 FIBA World Championship players
Russian men's basketball players
Olympic basketball players of the Soviet Union
Basketball players at the 1964 Summer Olympics
Olympic silver medalists for the Soviet Union
Olympic medalists in basketball
Medalists at the 1964 Summer Olympics
FIBA World Championship-winning players